Frode Gjerstad (born 24 March 1948) is a Norwegian jazz musician with alto saxophone as principal instrument, but he also plays other saxophones, clarinet, and flute. He has collaborated with Paal Nilssen-Love, Borah Bergman, Peter Brötzmann, Evan Parker, Derek Bailey, Bjørn Kjellemyr, Terje Isungset, William Parker, Sabir Mateen, John Stevens, Johnny Dyani, Kent Carter, and since 1979 has contributed to more than 50 recordings.

Career
Gjerstad played in the trio Detail together with the British drummer John Stevens, in the period 1981–1994, and they released fourteen albums. Other members of the band were the pianist Eivin One Pedersen (1981–82) and the mega  bassist's Johnny Dyani (1981–1986) or Kent Carter (1987–1994).

In 1985, he initiated "Circulasione Totale Orchestra", a band with varying lineups, where young musicians, mostly from Stavanger, could get a chance. To the Moldejazz 1989 he composed the commissioned work Dancemble which was performed by a 13-man version of the band. The band was active until 1995 and produced three recordings. In 1998, the band reemerged and released the album Borealis.

He also collaborated with numerous musicians in various small groups, which has resulted in several albums, tours and festival recordings in Norway, United States and Europe. The most long-lasting partnership in recent years is the current issue of Gjerstad Trio where he plays with drummer Paal Nilssen-Love and bassist Øyvind Storesund. They debuted at Nattjazz in Bergen 1999 and have released five albums.

Honors
1996: Jazz Musician of the Year by "Foreningen norske jazzmusikere"
2008: "Buddyprisen"
2010: "Stavanger kommunes kulturpris"

Discography

Solo albums
1998: Ism (Circulasione Totale)

As front man
Frode Gjerstad and the Circulasione Totale Orchestra
1998: Borealis (Cadence)

With John Stevens, Derek Bailey
2001: Hello Goodbye (Emanem)

With Terje Isungset
2002: Shadows and Light (FMR)

With Peter Brötzmann
2003: Soria Moria (FMR)

With John Edwards & Mark Sanders
2003: The Welsh Chapel (Cadence)

With Derek Bailey
2003: Nearly A D (Emanem)

With Steve Hubback
2003: Demystify (FMR)
2005: One Foot Moving (Utech)

With Lasse Marhaug
2003: Tou (FMR)

With Paul Hession
2004: May Day (FMR)

With Kevin Norton
2004: No Definitive (FMR)
2011: Tipples (FMR) with David Watson
2013: Live Tipple (FMR) with David Watson

With Anders Hana, Morten Olsen, Per Zanussi
2003: Born To Collapse (Circulasione Totale)

With Sabir Mateen
2005: Good Question (FMR)

With John Stevens
2005: Keep On Playing (FMR)

With Nils Henrik Asheim
2005: The Shortest Night (FMR)

With Jeffrey Hayden Shurdut - The Organic Plastic Band
2006: We Are As Organic As Cars (Nolabel)

With Daniel Carter, Jeffrey Hayden Shurdut
2006: Behind the White Fences (Nolabel)

With Eivind One Pedersen, Kevin Norton
2006: The Walk (FMR)

With Fred Lonberg-Holm
2006: The Cello Quartet (FMR), including with Amit Sen, Paal Nilssen-Love - The Cello Quartet
2010: Sugar Maple (FMR), including with Michael Zerang
2011: Tistel (FMR)

With Paal Nilssen-Love
2007: Day Before One (Tyyfus)
2010: Gromka (Not Two)
2012: Side By Side (CIMP)

With William Parker & Hamid Drake
2008: On Reade Street (FMR)

With John Edwards / Mark Sanders
2009: Bergen (FMR)

With Nick Stephens
2012: Different Times (Loose Torque)

With Skaset _ Tafjord _ Mølstad _ Moe
2013: Deichman (Conrad Sound)

With Luis Conte
2013: Mirrors Edges (FMR)

Collaborations
Within Detail
1983: Backwards and Forwards / Forwards And Backwards (Impetus Records), with Johnny Dyani and John Stevens
	
In trio with Rashid Bakr and William Parker
1996: Seeing New York From The Ear (Cadence)
	
With John Stevens
1996: Sunshine (Impetus)
	
With Peter Brötzmann
1999: Invisible Touch (Cadence )
	
With Borah Bergman
2003: Rivers in Time (FMR)	
	
With Jeffrey Shurdut
2004: Everything Is Divisible By 1 (Nolabel)

With Lasse Marhaug
2004: Red Edge (CD)	Breathmint, Carbon Records, Little Mafia Records, Sunship Records, Gameboy Records	BM 96, CR092, LM035, SUN38, GB55	2004		

With Bobby Bradford
2009: Reknes (Circulasione Totale), including with Ingebrigt Håker Flaten + Paal Nilssen-Love
2012: Kampen (NoBusiness), including with Ingebrigt Håker Flaten, Paal Nilssen-Love
2012: Dragon (PNL), including with Paal Nilssen-Love
2014: Silver Cornet (Nessa), including with Ingebrigt Håken Flaten, and Frank Rosaly

With Bennink
2009: Han & Frode (Cadence)

With Sabir Mateen feat. Steve Swell
2010: Sound Gathering (Not Two )

With Motland / Lonberg-Holm / Solberg
2011: VC/DC (Hispid)

With Fred Lonberg-Holm
2014: Life On Sandpaper (FMR)

With Louis Moholo
2014: Sult (FMR)
2015: Distant Groove'' (FMR), including with Nick Stephens, Fred Lonberg-Holm

References

External links 

Frode Gjerstad Biography - Norsk Jazzarkiv
Frode Gjerstad Trio biografi

20th-century Norwegian saxophonists
21st-century Norwegian saxophonists
Norwegian jazz saxophonists
Norwegian jazz composers
Musicians from Stavanger
1948 births
Living people
20th-century saxophonists
Utech Records artists
Cadence Jazz Records artists
Emanem Records artists
FMR Records artists